Guo Yihan (Chinese: 郭奕含, born on 9 March 1995) is a Chinese female short-track speed-skater. She won the gold medal for Ladies' 1000 meters in 2013 Winter Universiade, Trentino.

References

External links

1995 births
Living people
Asian Games medalists in short track speed skating
Asian Games silver medalists for China
Asian Games bronze medalists for China
Chinese female short track speed skaters
Competitors at the 2013 Winter Universiade
Four Continents Short Track Speed Skating Championships medalists
Medalists at the 2017 Asian Winter Games
Short track speed skaters at the 2017 Asian Winter Games
Universiade medalists in short track speed skating
Universiade gold medalists for China
World Short Track Speed Skating Championships medalists